WIN magazine (officially titled Wrestling Insider News Magazine) is a magazine that reports on all aspects of High School and College amateur wrestling in America. The magazine was started in 1994 and has its headquarters in Newton, Iowa.

References

External links
 win-magazine.com about us

1994 establishments in Iowa
Magazines established in 1994
Magazines published in Iowa
Martial arts magazines
Sports magazines published in the United States
Wrestling